Bolívar Merizalde (born 26 November 1941) is an Ecuadorian footballer. He played in two matches for the Ecuador national football team from 1963 to 1967. He was also part of Ecuador's squad for the 1963 South American Championship.

References

1941 births
Living people
Ecuadorian footballers
Ecuador international footballers
Association football forwards
Sportspeople from Guayaquil